Great Wakering Rovers Football Club is a football club located in Great Wakering, near Southend on Sea in Essex, England.

History
The club was formed in 1919 by soldiers demobbed after World War I and finding employment in the local brickfields. They joined the Southend & District League, dominating it during the 1960s and 1970s. In 1982 they switched to the newly-formed Southend & District Alliance Football League, but this league folded in 1989. At this point the club decided to make the step up to intermediate level and were founder members of the new Division Three of Essex Intermediate League.

In 1990–91 Great Wakering were Division Three champions, earning promotion to Division Two. After winning Division Two the following season, the club successfully applied to join the Essex Senior League. They went on to win the league in 1994–95 and finished as runners-up three times in the next two seasons. They were as runners-up again in 1998–99, but as champions Saffron Walden Town failed to meet the ground grading requirements for a place in Division Three of the Isthmian League, Great Wakering were promoted in their place.

The 1999–2000 season saw Great Wakering finish as runners-up in Division Three, earning promotion to Division Two. League restructuring resulted in them being moved to Division One North in 2002, and in 2004 they were transferred to the Eastern Division of the Southern League, where they remained for two seasons before being transferred back to Division One North of the Isthmian League. In 2011–12 the club finished bottom of the division, and were relegated back to the Essex Senior League. In 2013–14 the club were Essex Senior League champions and were promoted back to the Isthmian League. After finishing bottom of the division in 2016–17, the club were relegated to the Essex Senior League. However, they went on to win the league at the first attempt, earning promotion back to the renamed North Division of the Isthmian League.

Ground
In 1985 the club obtained a lease from the parish council on a disused allotment site. A football ground was built by volunteers with the help of local farmer and supporter Roger Burroughs, who it was named after. The ground opened in 1989, with work starting on the main stand (the North Stand) in 1992, at which time a small covered area was built on the other side of the pitch. A roof was put on the main stand in 1996 and 175 seats later installed. A new covered terrace was installed in 2000. The North Stand was also expanded and currently seats 250.

A record attendance of 1,150 was set in 2006 for a pre-season friendly against Southend United. The record was broken in July 2021 when a crowd of 1,500 watched another pre-season friendly against the same opponents.

Honours
Essex Senior League
Champions 1994–95, 2013–14, 2017–18
Essex Intermediate League
Division Two champions 1991–92
Division Three champions 1990–91

Records
Best FA Cup performance: Second qualifying round, 1998–99, 2006–07
Best FA Trophy performance: First round, 2002–03, 2004–05
Best FA Vase performance: Fifth round, 1997–98, 2001–02
Record attendance: 1,500 vs Southend United, friendly match, 20 July 2021
Most appearances: John Heffer 511
Biggest win: 9–0 vs Eton Manor, 27 December 1931
Heaviest defeat: 1–7 vs Bowers United, Essex Senior League, 1 April 1998

See also
Great Wakering Rovers F.C. players
Great Wakering Rovers F.C. managers

References

External links
Official website
 

 
Football clubs in England
Football clubs in Essex
Association football clubs established in 1919
1919 establishments in England
Essex Olympian Football League
Essex Senior Football League
Isthmian League
Southern Football League clubs